Chad Deering (born September 2, 1970) is an American former professional soccer player who played as a midfielder. Deering spent his professional career in Germany, Norway, Major League Soccer and Major Indoor Soccer League. He earned eighteen caps with the United States national team including one game in the 1998 FIFA World Cup.

Club career

Youth and early career
Deering grew up in Plano, Texas, a suburb of Dallas, where he attended Plano Senior High School. He was twice selected as a Parade high school All-American and was the 1988 Texas high school player of the year his senior year. While in high school, he debuted with the U.S. U-16 national team for whom he played at the 1987 FIFA U-16 World Championship. During that tournament, Deering scored a goal in a 4–2 loss to South Korea.

Deering was highly recruited out of high school and elected to play with Indiana University which had just won the NCAA Men's Soccer Championship. However, he left Indiana after only two seasons in order to pursue a professional career in Germany, having scored twelve goals and assisted on twelve others. He earned NCAA First-Team All-American honors his second, and final season, with Indiana. That year he was also the NCAA's post-season tournament's points leader with three goals and one assist.

Germany
Deering began his professional career with the SV Werder Bremen reserve team. After three years and no chance of playing for the Bremen first team, Deering moved to FC Schalke 04 in 1993 where he continued to languish playing for Schalke's amateur squad. In 1994, Deering played a single season with Rosenborg of the Norwegian Premier League. He returned to Germany the next year, becoming the first of several Americans to sign with Regionalliga team Kickers Emden. In 1996, he moved from Emden to German Second Division club VfL Wolfsburg and finally found a top German team which would play him. That season, he helped Wolfsburg gain promotion to the Bundesliga. The next year, Deering played fifteen games for Wolfsburg in its first year in the German top division.

MLS
In 1998, Deering expressed an interest in returning to the U.S. to play in Major League Soccer (MLS). He subsequently signed with the league, and on July 2, 1998, MLS allocated Deering to the Dallas Burn where he became a regular for the next seven years.

MISL
On January 24, 2004, Deering signed with the Dallas Sidekicks of Major Indoor Soccer League. The 2003–2004 season was nearly over and Deering played only nine games with the Sidekicks.

U.S. Minor Leagues
In 2004, he played with the DFW Tornados of the minor league Premier Development League. On December 30, 2004, the Charleston Battery of the USL First Division signed Deering. On March 16, 2005, Deering announced his retirement from professional soccer and his intention to return to Plano, Texas, to pursue a coaching career. He never played a game with the Battery, as its season had ended in August 2004 and the 2005 season did not begin until April 2005.

International career
Deering earned his first cap when he came on for Hugo Perez in a December 18, 1993 loss to Germany. Deering would go on to play eighteen games for the U.S. national team, scoring his only national team goal in a March 14, 1998, 2–2 tie with Paraguay. When U.S. coach Steve Sampson sacked John Harkes, the team's primary defensive midfielder prior to the 1998 FIFA World Cup, Sampson moved Deering into that position. However, Deering played only a single game, a 0–2 loss to Germany, in the World Cup.

Post-playing career
Deering was the director of coaching for the Blackwatch Soccer Club in McKinney, Texas which merged with Solar Soccer Club in Dallas. He was the Director of coaching for Solar in McKinney and coached the Solar 98 and 96 Girls Gold teams. Currently (2014) he is the President and Director of Coaching for Dallas Rush FC in McKinney, TX.

Deering now coaches club at DKSC in Dallas, TX, which is a merger of D’Feeters and Kicks.

References

External links
Dallas Sidekicks profile

1970 births
Living people
All-American men's college soccer players
Association football midfielders
American soccer players
United States men's international soccer players
American expatriate soccer players
American expatriate soccer players in Germany
American expatriate sportspeople in Norway
Expatriate footballers in Norway
People from Garland, Texas
Soccer players from Texas
Parade High School All-Americans (boys' soccer)
Indiana Hoosiers men's soccer players
FC St. Pauli players
SV Werder Bremen players
SV Werder Bremen II players
FC Schalke 04 players
Rosenborg BK players
Kickers Emden players
VfL Wolfsburg players
FC Dallas players
Dallas Sidekicks (2001–2008 MISL) players
Dallas Sidekicks (PASL/MASL) players
DFW Tornados players
Charleston Battery players
Bundesliga players
2. Bundesliga players
Eliteserien players
USL League Two players
Major League Soccer players
Major League Soccer All-Stars
1998 FIFA World Cup players
Sportspeople from Plano, Texas